Chatwin is a surname. Notable people with the surname include:

 Bruce Chatwin (1940–1989), English novelist and travel writer
 J. A. Chatwin (1830–1907), English designer and architect
 Justin Chatwin (born 1982), Canadian actor
 P. B. Chatwin (1873–1964), English architect, son of J. A. Chatwin